Atrolysin C (Crotalus atrox metalloendopeptidase c, hemorrhagic toxin c and d) is an enzyme. This enzyme catalyses the following chemical reaction

 Cleavage of His5-Leu, His10-Leu, Ala14-Leu, Tyr16-Leu and Gly23-Phe bonds in B chain of insulin. With small molecule substrates prefers hydrophobic residue at P2' and small residue such as Ala, Gly at P1

This endopeptidase is present in the venom of the western diamondback rattlesnake (Crotalus atrox).

References

External links 
 

EC 3.4.24